1505 Koranna, provisional designation , is a stony Eunomia asteroid from the central regions of the asteroid belt, approximately 21 kilometers in diameter. It was discovered on 21 April 1939, by South African astronomer Cyril Jackson at the Union Observatory in Johannesburg. The asteroid was named for the native Koranna people of South Africa.

Orbit and classification 

Koranna is a non-family asteroid of the main belt's background population when applying the hierarchical clustering method to its proper orbital elements. The asteroid has also been classified as a member of the Eunomia family, a prominent family of stony S-type asteroid and the largest one in the intermediate main belt with more than 5,000 members.

It orbits the Sun in the central main belt at a distance of 2.3–3.0 AU once every 4 years and 4 months (1,584 days). Its orbit has an eccentricity of 0.13 and an inclination of 14° with respect to the ecliptic.

Physical characteristics 

Koranna is an assumed stony S-type asteroid.

Rotation period 

Between 2088 and 2013, three rotational lightcurves of Koranna have been obtained from photometric observations. Lightcurve analysis gave a rotation period of 4.45, 4.451 and 4.452 hours with a brightness variation of 0.70, 0.55 and 0.53, respectively magnitude. A high brightness amplitude typically indicates that the body has an elongated, non-spherical shape.

Diameter and albedo 

According to the surveys carried out by the Infrared Astronomical Satellite IRAS, the Japanese Akari satellite and the NEOWISE mission of NASA's Wide-field Infrared Survey Explorer, Koranna measures between 20.46 and 22.83 kilometers in diameter and its surface has an albedo between 0.082 and 0.127. The Collaborative Asteroid Lightcurve Link derives an albedo of 0.1209 and a diameter of 21.00 kilometers based on an absolute magnitude of 11.3.

Naming 

This minor planet was named after the native Koranna people, better known as the Griqua people of South Africa. The tribe of wandering San people (Bushman) lives in the southern part of the Kalahari Desert in southern Africa. The official  was published by the Minor Planet Center in April 1953.

Notes

References

External links 
 Asteroid Lightcurve Database (LCDB), query form (info )
 Dictionary of Minor Planet Names, Google books
 Asteroids and comets rotation curves, CdR – Observatoire de Genève, Raoul Behrend
 Discovery Circumstances: Numbered Minor Planets (1)-(5000) – Minor Planet Center
 
 

001505
Discoveries by Cyril Jackson (astronomer)
Named minor planets
19390421